Jezierzyca Valley Landscape Park (Park Krajobrazowy Dolina Jezierzycy) is a protected area (Landscape Park) in south-western Poland, established in 1994, covering an area of .

The Park lies within Lower Silesian Voivodeship, in Wołów County (Gmina Wołów, Gmina Wińsko).

Jezierzyca Valley
Parks in Lower Silesian Voivodeship